Like most other countries, Sweden is home to a variety of non-governmental organizations (NGOs). Among those with international reach are the Nobel Foundation and the Olof Palme International Center.

Business and industry 
Confederation of Swedish Enterprise (Svenskt Näringsliv)
Swedish Confederation of Professional Associations (SACO)
Swedish Confederation of Professional Employees (TCO)
Swedish Union of Clerical and Technical Employees in Industry (SIF)
Swedish Trade Union Confederation (LO)
Central Organisation of the Workers of Sweden (SAC)

Defence 
Society and Defence (Folk och Försvar)

Think tanks 
Timbro
Agora
Eudoxa

Foundations 
Nobel Foundation (Nobelstiftelsen)

Other 
Olof Palme International Center
Piratbyrån
SVEROK
Swedish Federation of Young Musicians
Tolkien Society of Sweden

See also 
Government Agencies in Sweden
Swedish Royal Academies
List of political parties in Sweden
List of Swedish companies
List of Swedish government enterprises

Non-gov
Non-governmental